Eion Francis Hamilton Bailey (born June 8, 1976) is an American actor. 

He stars as Jim Matthews in the epix horror series From. He played Pvt. David Kenyon Webster in the HBO miniseries Band of Brothers and appeared in the films Fight Club, Center Stage, Mindhunters, and Sexual Life. He had a recurring role on the USA Network TV series Covert Affairs and played August (Pinocchio) in the ABC TV series Once Upon a Time. He also had a recurring role as Ray, a psychopathic killer in the CBS series Stalker. 

Bailey married Weyni Mengesha, an award-winning Canadian theatre director, in 2011.  The couple have two children.

Career
Bailey struggled in school until he found his calling in his high school's drama department. He was soon performing in each school play and went on to study formally at the American Academy of Dramatic Arts in New York City. He briefly attended Santa Barbara City College. He appeared in Almost Famous, portraying Jann Wenner. He was seen in Center Stage, Fight Club, Catherine Jelski's The Young Unknowns, The Scoundrel's Wife, Seven and a Match, Renny Harlin's Mindhunters for Miramax, and the independent feature Sexual Life for director Ken Kwapis. He auditioned for the role of Bruce Wayne in Batman Begins (2005).

His television appearances include Dawson's Creek, HBO's highly acclaimed series Band of Brothers produced by Tom Hanks and Steven Spielberg, and the HBO original film And Starring Pancho Villa as Himself opposite Antonio Banderas.

Onstage, Bailey appeared in Equus at the Pasadena Playhouse, as well as Spoon River Anthology, Look Homeward, Angel, and Dinner at Eight at the American Academy of Dramatic Arts, Desire and I at the Access Theatre Santa Barbara, and Icarus' Mother at the SBCC Studio Theatre. 

In 2007, Bailey was awarded a Daytime Emmy for his performance in Life of the Party. Bailey had recurring guest-starring roles on the TV series Dawson's Creek and ER. 

In 2010, Bailey had a recurring role in USA Network's Covert Affairs as Ben Mercer, Annie's ex-boyfriend, who was being targeted by the CIA, before returning to the Agency near the end of Season 1. Bailey had a guest role on 30 Rock in 2011 as Anders, a love interest of Liz Lemon's who is "definitely not a Swiss prostitute that Martha Stewart recommended." In 2012, Bailey started recurring on Once Upon a Time as August Booth.

On May 1, 2013, Bailey guest-starred in "Traumatic Wound" on Law & Order: Special Victims Unit as Frank Patterson, an Iraq war veteran with PTSD who becomes a key witness in an investigation of a sexual assault in a nightclub.

Filmography

Film

Television

References

External links

1976 births
Living people
American male film actors
American male stage actors
American male television actors
Male actors from California
Daytime Emmy Award winners
American Academy of Dramatic Arts alumni
20th-century American male actors
21st-century American male actors